The Invisible Committee is the  of an anonymous author or authors who have written French works of literature based on far-left politics and anarchism. The identity of the Invisible Committee has been associated with the Tarnac Nine, a group of people including Julien Coupat who were arrested "on the grounds that they were to have participated in the sabotage of overhead electrical lines on France's national railways."

The Invisible Committee is classified as ultra-left by the Ministry of the Interior of the second Fillon government. Denying the label of "author", this committee claims to be an "instance of strategic enunciation for the revolutionary movement".

Works

See also
 Insurrectionary anarchism
 Invisible Party
 Situationist International
 Tiqqun

References

Further reading

External links
 Full texts

21st-century French philosophers
Anarchist organizations in France
French communists
Unidentified people
French socialists